The fourth competition weekend of the 2008–09 ISU Speed Skating World Cup was a two-day event focusing on the shorter distances, held at the Jilin Provincial Speed Skating Rink in Changchun, China, from Saturday, 6 December, until Sunday, 7 December 2008. It was the first World Cup competition at this rink, which was also used during the 2007 Asian Winter Games.

Schedule of events
The schedule of the event is below.

Medal winners

Men's events

Women's events

References

4
Isu World Cup, 2008-09, 4
Sport in Changchun